The Convincing Ground Massacre was a massacre of the Indigenous Gunditjmara people Kilcarer gundidj clan by British settler whalers based at Portland Bay in South-Eastern Australia. It was part of the wider Eumeralla Wars between the British colonisers and Gunditjmara.
Tensions between the two groups had been building since the establishment of the town as a whaling station some five years previously, however, around 1833 or 1834, a dispute over a beached whale caused events to escalate.

The massacre has been recognised by academics and state officials as a significant event in the state's history, with Professor Lynette Russell from Australian Indigenous Studies at Monash University saying that the "Convincing Ground is probably the first recorded massacre site for Victoria." The Convincing Ground, site of the massacre, which lies in Portland Bay close to the town in the Shire of Glenelg has been listed on the Victorian Heritage Register.

Causes
The dispute appears to have arisen over the ownership of a beached whale. While reports are varied on casualties, it is clear that Gunditjmara people were determined to assert their right to the whale as traditional food and when challenged by the whalers, were aggressive in return.

Massacre
According to Edward Henty and Police Magistrate James Blair in conversation with George Augustus Robinson, the Protector of Aborigines in 1841, the whalers withdrew to the head station only to return with their firearms. Robinson's journal entry says "And the whalers then let fly, to use his expression, right and left upon the natives. He said the natives did not go away but got behind trees and threw spears and stones. They, however, did not much molest them after that." No mention was made in the conversation as to casualties. Later reports arising from a meeting in 1842 that Robinson had with Gunditjmara people stated only two members survived the massacre.

The reason for this uncertainty over casualties and the actual date of the massacre appears to stem from the fact that the incident was only reported and documented several years after its occurrence. The earliest documented mention of the Convincing Ground locality is in an entry of Edward Henty's diary dated 18 October 1835.

George Augustus Robinson visited the site of the massacre in 1841 and talked with local squatters and made the following official report (although he made more extensive notes in his journal):

Among the remarkable places on the coast, is the "Convincing Ground", originating in a severe conflict which took place in a few years previous between the Aborigines and the Whalers on which occasion a large number of the former were slain. The circumstances are that a whale had come on shore and the Natives who fed on the carcass claimed it was their own. The whalers said they would "convince them" and had recourse to firearms. On this spot a fishery is now established.

Robinson was only briefed by Aborigines on the massacre when 30 men and women from various clans of the Gunditjmara people met with him on 23 March 1842 at Campbell's station on the Merri River and told him that all but two men of the Kilcarer gundidj clan were slain in the massacre. The two survivors were called Pollikeunnuc and Yarereryarerer and were adopted by the Cart Gundidj clan of Mount Clay. The Cart Gundidj would not allow any member of the clan to go near the settlement of Portland following the massacre, although in May 1842 Cart Gundidj resistance leader Partpoaermin was captured at the Convincing Ground after a violent struggle.

Historian Richard Broome estimated that about 60 were killed at the Convincing Ground massacre. Bruce Pascoe, in his book published in 2007 titled Convincing Ground – Learning to Fall in love with your country, said: "The Gundidjmara were beaten in that battle but never convinced of its legitimacy".

Origin of 'Convincing Ground'

There has also been debate over the origin of the term, Convincing Ground, with three different European based accounts:
 Edward Henty and Police Magistrate Jim Blair's account of a violent altercation to "convince" the Aborigines of European "rights" to land and resources which led Robinson to write that a large number of people were slain;
 that it was a place where whalers settled disputes between themselves; and
 a popular account that the site was named by explorer Thomas Mitchell when he visited in August 1836, was still being promoted in 2008 by Portland Rotary Club.

Henty's diary entry referring to the Convincing Ground by name in October 1835 precedes the visit of Mitchell so logically invalidates this account. Historian Professor Ian D. Clark wrote that the account by Henty and Blair as told to Robinson is the most likely source of origin.

A fourth account – the oral tradition and reports by the Gunditjmara people – was that a massacre took place almost wiping out an entire clan to "convince them" of white rights to the land."

Professor Clark told Message Stick documentary in 2007:
If we deny the history that goes with the Convincing Ground – and that is both the very good documentary evidence that we have, plus the very good oral history that we have from the Gunditjmara people, we are denying Aboriginal people their history, and if we deny Aboriginal people their history, we are denying a major part of the history of Australia.

Historical skepticism
Stuart Rintoul, in a 2007 newspaper article about the Federal Court decision granting Gunditjmara people native title to land including the Convincing Ground site, wrote that Keith Windschuttle and writer Michael Connor dispute that a massacre took place and allege that the story of the massacre is "myth-making" and "very dubious". In reply, Ian Clark argued this was based on an inaccurate reading of the history.

2005–2007 controversy
In 2005 a developer was granted the right to build homes on the site. This caused a dispute between the Western Victorian Glenelg Shire Council and the local Koorie community on whether or not the location should be protected.

Kilcarer clan traditional owner Walter Saunders, a descendant of one of the two massacre survivors, explained the cultural importance of the site on ABC Local Radio:
It stands on the same level as the Eureka Stockade and Gallipoli from our perspective. It is the first recorded massacre in the state. This is where Aboriginal people and non-Aboriginal people fought over the resources of this great country and they happened to kill a large number of my relatives and my mother's relatives.

As a result of a confidential agreement in 2007, some development would occur but the "Convincing Ground" would become a public reservation.

See also
 List of massacres in Australia
 Convincing Ground
 Eumeralla Wars

References

Further reading

External links
 
 
 
 
 

1833 in Australia
Massacres in 1833
History of Victoria (Australia)
Victorian Heritage Register
Whaling in Australia
Massacres of Indigenous Australians